Mapleton is a small village in Peoria County, Illinois, United States. The population was 227 at the 2000 census. Mapleton is part of the Peoria, Illinois Metropolitan Statistical Area. There are four different plants in Mapleton, all located along U.S. Route 24: an Evonik chemical plant, a Lonza Group plant, a Caterpillar Inc. foundry, and an Ingredion facility; together, the large industrial complex forms one of Mapleton's (and the wider Peoria area's) most significant employers and a good source of skilled employees and good jobs.

Geography

Demographics

As of the census of 2000, there were 227 people, 100 households, and 57 families residing in the village. The racial makeup of the village was 96.92% White, 1.32% Native American, and 1.76% from two or more races.

There were 100 households, out of which 21.0% had children under the age of 18 living with them, 51.0% were married couples living together, 3.0% had a female householder with no husband present, and 43.0% were non-families. 36.0% of all households were made up of individuals, and 18.0% had someone living alone who was 65 years of age or older. The average household size was 2.27 and the average family size was 3.07.

In the village, the population was spread out, with 16.3% under the age of 18, 11.0% from 18 to 24, 30.0% from 25 to 44, 27.8% from 45 to 64, and 15.0% who were 65 years of age or older. The median age was 41 years. For every 100 females, there were 122.5 males. For every 100 females age 18 and over, there were 118.4 males.

The median income for a household in the village was $45,357, and the median income for a family was $63,750. Males had a median income of $35,208 versus $19,423 for females. The per capita income for the village was $22,728. About 3.3% of families and 6.6% of the population were below the poverty line, including none of those under the age of 18 or 65 or over.

References

Villages in Peoria County, Illinois
Villages in Illinois
Peoria metropolitan area, Illinois